William Curry or Currie may refer to:

Politics
William Currie (British politician) (1756–1829), British MP for Gatton, 1790, and Winchelsea, 1796
William Currie (Canadian politician) (1862–1934), manufacturer and political figure in New Brunswick, Canada
Bill Curry (politician) (born 1951), American politician, Comptroller of the State of Connecticut, 1990–1994

Sports
Bill Currie (baseball) (1928–2013), American baseball player
Bill Curry (English footballer) (1935–1990), English football forward active in the 1950s and 1960s
Bill Currie (footballer) (born 1940s), Scottish footballer
Bill Curry (born 1942), American college football coach

Other
William D. Curry (1926–2013), United States Air Force officer
William Curry (designer) also credited as Bill Curry (1927–1971), American designer
William Curry (oceanographer), American oceanographer
Billy Currie (born 1950), British musician and songwriter, keyboard player with Ultravox
William Curry, a character in the U.S. TV series Last Resort
William J. Curry (1821–1896), Key West wrecking tycoon and Florida's first millionaire
William Henry Curry, American conductor

See also
William Curry Holden (1896–1993), historian and archaeologist